Holbav is a commune in Brașov County, Transylvania, Romania. It is composed of a single village, Holbav, part of Vulcan Commune until 2004, when it was split off.

The commune lies on the banks of the river Holbav, at the foot of the Perșani Mountains.

References

See also
 

Communes in Brașov County
Localities in Transylvania